Daniel Paillé (born April 1, 1950) is a Canadian politician, who represented the riding of Prévost in the National Assembly of Quebec from 1994 to 1996 as a member of the Parti Québécois, and represented the district of Hochelaga in the House of Commons of Canada as a member of the Bloc Québécois. He was elected leader of the Bloc Québécois with 62 percent of the vote on December 11, 2011. Paillé stepped down as leader on December 16, 2013 due to health reasons.

Life and career
He was first elected in the 1994 election, and served as Industry minister in the government of Jacques Parizeau. He resigned as an MNA on November 19, 1996 to accept a job as vice-president of Quebec's Société générale de financement.

He was appointed by Prime Minister Stephen Harper in 2007 to investigate allegations that the Liberal Party had engaged in improper polling practices prior to the 2006 election, although his final report found evidence of substantial irregularities in Harper's own Conservative Party as well.

Paillé ran as a Bloc Québécois candidate in the federal by-election in Hochelaga on November 9, 2009, and won election to the House of Commons. His nephew, Pascal-Pierre Paillé, was elected as a Bloc Québécois MP for Louis-Hébert in the 2008 election.

Paillé lost his seat in the 2011 election which also resulted in the defeat and resignation of Gilles Duceppe (the previous BQ leader) and the reduction of the BQ to four seats. He was defeated by the NDP's Marjolaine Boutin-Sweet. Despite losing his seat, he succeeded Gilles Duceppe as Party Leader in the 2011 Bloc Québécois leadership election. Paillé defeated two sitting Bloc Québécois Members of Parliament to be elected BQ leader on December 11, 2011. He resigned from the leadership on December 16, 2013 due to health issues caused by epilepsy.

Electoral record

References

External links

 

1950 births
Bloc Québécois leaders
Bloc Québécois MPs
French Quebecers
Living people
Members of the Executive Council of Quebec
Members of the House of Commons of Canada from Quebec
Parti Québécois MNAs
Politicians from Montreal
HEC Montréal alumni
Academic staff of HEC Montréal
Université du Québec à Montréal alumni
21st-century Canadian politicians